Gabriel Eduardo Achilier Zurita (born March 24, 1985) is an Ecuadorian footballer who plays for Orense S.C. in the Liga PRO Ecuador as a centre-back.

Club career
Born in Machala, Achilier began his professional career  in Liga Deportiva Universitaria de Loja. There, he established himself as one of the growing, future defender of the national team. In 2004, he left to join Deportivo Azogues.

In Azogues, he began to make a name for himself through his marvelous performances. Achilier helped Azogues qualify for the 2007 Liguilla Final of Ecuador's Serie A. Azogues did not win the tournament but did good overall. In 2008, however, Achilier matured more in the game but Azogues had a horrible season. Azogues was last in the table and did not do well in the second fase either. As a result, Achilier and Azogues were relegated down to the second division.

In November 2008, Achilier became Emelec's first offseason reinforcement. He was loaned with an option to buy.

In December 2009, Club Sport Emelec enforced its option to buy over the player and signed him on a 5-year contract, because of his great performances as a "problem solver" for the manager, being able to play in several different positions of the pitch when needed.

International career
Achilier  was called up to represent Ecuador on May 27, 2008 against France.

International goals
Scores and results list Ecuador's goal tally first.

Achievements

Club
CS Emelec
Serie A: 2013, 2014, 2015

Personal life
Achilier was married to Marly Romero and the pair had three children. In May 2016 Achilier's wife Romero was diagnosed with cancer, and on 23 January 2017 she died at Reina del Cisne clinic in the town of Piñas, El Oro province.

References

External links

1985 births
Living people
People from Machala
Ecuadorian footballers
Ecuadorian expatriate footballers
Ecuador international footballers
Association football defenders
CD Oro footballers
C.D. Cuenca footballers
L.D.U. Loja footballers
Deportivo Azogues footballers
C.S. Emelec footballers
Atlético Morelia players
Orense S.C. players
Ecuadorian Serie A players
Liga MX players
2011 Copa América players
2014 FIFA World Cup players
2015 Copa América players
Copa América Centenario players
2019 Copa América players
Ecuadorian expatriate sportspeople in Mexico
Expatriate footballers in Mexico